The Lithuania national rugby union team represents Lithuania in men's international rugby union competitions. Nicknamed The Knights (Vytis), is considered one of the relatively stronger tier 3 teams in European rugby and currently compete in the second division of the Rugby Europe International Championships in the Rugby Europe Trophy, a competition which is just below the Rugby Europe Championship where the top 6 countries in Europe (apart from the teams in the 6 nations) compete. They are yet to participate in any Rugby World Cup and play in black with a pattern involving the colours red, yellow and green (the colours of the Lithuanian flag).

History

Rugby was first introduced into Lithuania in 1961. However, as the country was a part of USSR, the national team could not be formed. After the collapse of the USSR, Lithuania could finally form their very own national team where they would start playing unofficial friendlies against Latvia, their traditional rivals as well as representative team from Kaliningrad before finally playing their first official game against Germany, in 1993 where they lost with the score 31-5.

After the reestablishment of independence in 1990, Lithuania's rugby authorities worked to gain international recognition after gaining continental recognition in 1991 by FIRA Europe (as it was known at the time) and by 1993, the national team were participating in the qualifying for the 1995 Rugby World Cup. Lithuania also participated in the 1992-1994 FIRA Trophy competition at the bottom of the pyramid but failed to win any of their games. Later on in 1996, Lithuania had achieved their first official victory against Luxembourg during the qualifying competition for the 1999 World Cup. Overall, the 1990s were a poor decade for the national team, yet it must be considered that they were a relatively new country, never mind the fact that Lithuania started playing test match rugby in 1993.

Up until 2006, Lithuania was lingering in the middle of the third division of the European Nations Cup. However, a 100 percent record in their 2006-2008 European Nations Cup Third Division campaign earned them promotion from Division 3B to Division 3A. This effort was followed by another perfect record in the 2008-2010 European Nations Cup Third Division and a further promotion to Division 2A. Moreover, victories over Israel and the Netherlands would take them to the semifinal round of the European qualification tournament for a spot in the 2011 Rugby World Cup Final Place Play-off. The rise in form of the national had thus resulted in an increase in the popularity of the sport in Lithuania.

During their 2008–10 European Nations Cup campaign, Lithuania was credited with setting a new record for consecutive Test wins in men's rugby. Their 77–5 away win over Serbia on April 24, 2010 was listed as their 18th straight, surpassing the previous record set by New Zealand in 1965–69 and by South Africa in 1997–98. This undefeated campaign, which could have led to a Lithuanian presence at the 2011 Rugby World Cup, ended in the 27–16 loss to Ukraine in the European qualifying semifinal.  However, on later review, it was found that the first game in the 18-game sequence was in fact a loss, and as such are now credited with having held an equal record with South Africa and New Zealand (the record would later be broken by Cyprus in 2013).

Record

World Cup

European Competitions

Overall

Recent Matches

Current squad
The following players are in the match day squad for the 2021–22 Rugby Europe Trophy game against  Switzerland on 13th November 2021.

Head Coach:  Gediminas Marcišauskas

Recent call-ups
The following players have also been called up to the squad within the last 12 months.

Current coaching staff
The current coaching staff of the Lithuanian national team:

Former coaches

See also
 Rugby union in Lithuania
 Lietuvos Regbio Federacija
 Lithuania national rugby sevens team
 Lithuania women's national rugby sevens team
 Sport in Lithuania

References

External links
Lietuvos Regbio Federacija - Official Site 

Rugby union in Lithuania
Teams in European Nations Cup (rugby union)
European national rugby union teams
National sports teams of Lithuania